Donald Windsor McGrath (13 June 1914 – 8 June 2001) was an Australian rules footballer who played with St Kilda in the Victorian Football League (VFL).

McGrath enlisted in the Royal Australian Air Force in July 1940, serving both in Australia and in New Guinea until the end of World War II.

Notes

External links 

1914 births
2001 deaths
Australian rules footballers from New South Wales
St Kilda Football Club players
West Broken Hill Football Club players